Trouble Brewing is a 1924 American silent comedy film featuring Larry Semon, Carmelita Geraghty and Oliver Hardy. A print of the film exists.

Cast
 Larry Semon as Government agent
 Carmelita Geraghty as The Girl
 Oliver Hardy as Bootlegger (as Babe Hardy)
 William Hauber
 Al Thompson

See also
 List of American films of 1924
 Oliver Hardy filmography
List of lost films

References

External links

Trouble Brewing at SilentEra

1924 films
1924 comedy films
1924 short films
American silent short films
American black-and-white films
Films directed by Larry Semon
Lost American films
Silent American comedy films
American comedy short films
1924 lost films
Lost comedy films
1920s American films